Cardiotoxin III (CTX III, also known as cytotoxin 3) is a sixty amino-acid polypeptide toxin from the Taiwan Cobra Naja atra. It is an example of a group of snake cardio/cytotoxins, which are made up of shorter snake venom three-finger toxins.

Recent evidence has shown that CTX III may induce apoptosis in K562 cells via the release of cytochrome c.

References 

Vertebrate toxins
Peripheral membrane proteins